Felsőtelekes is a village in Borsod-Abaúj-Zemplén County in northeastern Hungary. , the village had a population of  773.

References

Populated places in Borsod-Abaúj-Zemplén County